Deligrad (Jabukovac
) is a village in the municipality of Aleksinac, Serbia. According to the 2002 census, the village has a population of 211 people.

History
In December 1806, it was the site of a major battle between the Serbs and the Turks, known as the Battle of Deligrad. Again, during the 1876-1877 Serbian-Ottoman war, there was a battle in Deligrad on 20 to 21 October 1876. In 1941, elements of the Yugoslav 26th Mounted Division fought their last battle against the invading Germans at Deligrad.

References

External links

Populated places in Nišava District